Prigorje Brdovečko  is a village in Croatia. It is connected by the D225 highway.

Populated places in Zagreb County